The Philippines national basketball team may refer to:
Philippines men's national basketball team
Philippines women's national basketball team
Philippines men's national under-19 basketball team
Philippines men's national under-17 basketball team
Philippines women's national under-19 basketball team
Philippines women's national under-17 basketball team